The longfin African conger (Conger cinereus) or blacklip conger, is an eel of the family Congridae, found in the Indo-Pacific oceans from the Red Sea and East Africa to the Marquesas and Easter islands, north to southern Japan and the Ogasawara Islands, south to northern Australia and Lord Howe Island, at depths down to 80 m. Length is up to 1.3 m.

References

External links
 Fishes of Australia : Conger cinereus
 

longfin African conger
Marine fauna of East Africa
Marine fish of Northern Australia
Taxa named by Eduard Rüppell 
longfin African conger